The Happiest Days of Our Lives: The Complete Joan of Arc Tapes was a 2CD compilation album released by My Favorite on the Double Agent record label in 2003. It compiled the group's then out-of-print "Joan of Arc" material. The second disc is a collection of remixes by such bands as Soviet, Flowchart, and Future Bible Heroes.

Track listing
 The Happiest Days of My Life [#] 3:02
 Homeless Club Kids 5:12
 The Suburbs Are Killing Us 3:45
 L=P 3:22
 Burning Hearts 5:42
 A Cathedral at Night [#] 4:53
 White Roses for Blue Girls 4:04
 John Dark (Goodnight, Major Tom) 3:15
 Half There and Dancing [#] 3:51
 The Black Cassette 3:21
 Badge (Grace Under Pressure) 3:45
 Le Monster 4:58
 The Radiation 3:56
 James Dean (Awaiting Ambulance) [#] 3:48
 Rescue Us 4:17
 The Lesser Saints 3:21
 The Suburbs Are Killing Us [Double Agent Remix] 4:32
 Homeless Club Kids [Future Bible Heroes Remix] 8:22
 Badge [Soviet Remix] 3:48
 Le Monster [Phofo Remix] 5:15
 John Dark [Leisure Enthusiast Remix] 3:18
 Rescue Us [Kitch Remix] 3:13
 Homeless Club Kids [Alexander Perls Remix] 6:41
 Le Monster [Flowchart Remix] 5:06
 Badge [San Serac Remix] 4:44
 The Suburbs Are Killing Us [Leisure Enthusiast Remix] 3:44
 Rescue Us [Chuck Blake Remix] 3:37
 Le Monster [Chuck Blake Remix] 4:28
 John Dark [Brother Frost Remix] 6:46
 Homeless Club Kids [Double Agent Remix] 5:34

My Favorite albums
2003 compilation albums
2003 remix albums